The discography of American singer-songwriter The-Dream consists of six studio albums, most of which on Def Jam Recordings. His career also includes a number of singles, guest appearances, and various writing/production credits. In the summer of 2015, it was announced that he had left Capitol Records leaving future releases on hold.

Studio albums

Cover albums

Compilation albums

Mixtapes/EPs

Visual albums

Singles

As lead artist

As featured artist

Promotional singles

Other charted songs

Guest appearances

Music videos

See also
The-Dream production discography

References

External links
The-Dream on Myspace

Discographies of American artists
Hip hop discographies
Rhythm and blues discographies